The Manayunk/Norristown Line is a commuter rail service in Southeastern Pennsylvania between Center City Philadelphia and Norristown, and one of the 13 lines in SEPTA's Regional Rail network. It has the fourth highest ridership and the highest operating ratio (58%) on the SEPTA Regional Rail network.

Route

From there, they use the Center City Commuter Connection of the SEPTA Main Line, making all stops between 30th Street Station and North Broad station. From North Broad, trains use the Norristown Branch, traveling through Philadelphia's East Falls and Manayunk neighborhoods and Conshohocken before reaching Norristown. At the Norristown Transportation Center, commuters can transfer to SEPTA surface buses or the SEPTA Norristown High Speed Line to 69th Street Transportation Center.

, most weekday Manayunk/Norristown Line trains terminate at 30th Street Station or continue to Wawa on the Media/Wawa Line.  Most weekend Manayunk/Norristown Line trains continue to Wilmington on the Wilmington/Newark Line.

History

The Manayunk/Norristown Line is a continuation of the Reading Company's suburban services on the Norristown Branch from Philadelphia to Norristown, Pennsylvania. Electrified service to Norristown and Chestnut Hill East began on February 5, 1933. Steam (and later diesel)-operated intercity services continued to operate beyond Norristown. By the 1960s Budd Rail Diesel Cars handled most of the Reading's diesel services, although the Reading's EMD FP7 locomotives, displaced from the Crusader, saw regular use on the Philadelphia–Reading run. SEPTA discontinued services beyond Norristown on July 26, 1981.

Between 1984–2010 the route was designated R6 Norristown as part of SEPTA's diametrical reorganization of its lines. Manayunk/Norristown Line trains operated through the city center to the Ivy Ridge Line (later Cynwyd) on the ex-Pennsylvania side of the system. The R-number naming system was dropped on July 25, 2010. SEPTA undertook a series of operational and physical improvements of the Norristown Branch beginning in 2013, culminating in the activation of positive train control on August 15, 2016.

On April 9, 2020, service on the line was suspended due to the COVID-19 pandemic, though  and  stations were still being served by other rail services. Service resumed on June 28, 2020. On September 1-2, 2021, the remnants of Hurricane Ida caused severe flooding along the Schuylkill River, with the Manayunk/Norristown Line between Miquon and Norristown flooded and damaged. As a result, service along the line was suspended. Service between Center City Philadelphia and Spring Mill resumed on September 7 while service along the entire length of the line to Norristown resumed on September 13.

Proposed extensions beyond Norristown
Like the Cynwyd Line, the Manayunk/Norristown Line was slated to become part of the planned new Schuylkill Valley Metro, but was to serve the King of Prussia mall complex and the former Pennsylvania Railroad's Trenton Cut-Off line to Frazer. This was referred to by planners as the "Cross-County Segment." An extension of the Manayunk/Norristown Line, called the Norristown Extension, to Wyomissing was later proposed, with funding to come through new tolls on U.S. Route 422.

As of mid-2018, the borough of Phoenixville is studying the restoration of SEPTA train service by extending the Manayunk/Norristown Line using old Reading Line track past Norristown, currently used for freight trains by Norfolk Southern along its Harrisburg Line. In 2018, a panel led by the Greater Reading Chamber Alliance pushed for an extension of the Manayunk/Norristown Line to Reading, with service terminating either at the Franklin Street Station in Reading or in Wyomissing. The proposed extension would utilize existing Norfolk Southern freight railroad tracks. Before service can be implemented, a study would need to take place.

In 2020, the Pennsylvania Department of Transportation (PennDOT) finalized a study on the feasibility of extending passenger train service from Norristown to Reading along the Norfolk Southern freight line. The proposed extension is projected to cost $818 million, which includes buying the trains and paying Norfolk Southern to use the line. The service is projected to have an annual operating cost of between $18 million and $25 million. Stations will be located in Reading (Franklin Street Station), Birdsboro, Pottstown, Royersford, Phoenixville, Valley Forge, and Norristown (Norristown Transportation Center); from where the train will follow the existing Manayunk/Norristown Line to Philadelphia. As the section between Reading and Norristown is not electrified, the service will either require dual mode locomotives or the extension of electrification beyond Norristown in order to provide a one-seat ride between Reading and Philadelphia; another option would be to operate diesel-powered trains between Reading and Norristown that would offer a transfer to electric-powered trains at Norristown for service to Philadelphia. In addition, a third track would need to be constructed between Reading and Norristown in order to accommodate both passenger service and Norfolk Southern freight trains. The proposal calls for between 6 and 9 daily round trips to Reading and has a projected weekday ridership between 3,400 and 6,400 by 2030. Following the PennDOT feasibility study, a feasibility study by Norfolk Southern needs to be conducted and the proposal needs to be added to the PennDOT rail plan, which would allow for Federal Railroad Administration grants to be used for studies of the proposed service.

As part of the process of implementing passenger train service from Norristown to Reading, county commissioners from Berks, Chester, and Montgomery counties will create the Tri-County Passenger Rail Committee, which will consist of three members named by each county.

Rail service between Reading and Philadelphia along the Norfolk Southern line is included in Amtrak's service vision for 2035. In August 2021, Amtrak revealed their plan for train service from Reading to Philadelphia and New York City. Train service would follow the Norfolk Southern line between Reading and Philadelphia and Amtrak's Northeast Corridor between Philadelphia and New York City. Station stops will be located in Reading, Pottstown, Phoenixville, King of Prussia, Norristown, Philadelphia (30th Street Station), North Philadelphia, Cornwells Heights, Trenton, Princeton Junction, New Brunswick, Metropark, Newark Airport, Newark (Penn Station), and New York City (Penn Station). Service would include three daily roundtrips and travel time would take 1 hour and 37 minutes between Reading and Philadelphia and 2 hours and 55 minutes between Reading and New York City. In 2022, Amtrak announced plans for an Amtrak Thruway express bus route between Franklin Street in Reading and 30th Street Station in Philadelphia, with an intermediate stop at Pottstown, to test if there is enough ridership for rail service. The service will be operated by a private bus company and will run for two years. On June 6, 2022, the Amtrak Thruway bus connecting Philadelphia to Reading via Pottstown began service. The service, which is operated by Krapf Coaches, consists of two daily round trips. Stops are located at 30th Street Station in Philadelphia, Hanover Street near the Charles W. Dickinson Transportation Center in Pottstown, and the BARTA Transportation Center in Reading.

Stations

The Manayunk/Norristown Line makes the following station stops after leaving the Center City Commuter Connection; stations indicated with a gray background are closed.

Former diesel service
Prior to July 26, 1981, RDC diesel trains operated north of Norristown to Reading and Pottsville. Until 2011, SEPTA had considered restoring service as far as Reading as part of the Schuylkill Valley Metro project. These plans are currently on hold. The following is a list of stations formerly served by SEPTA.

Ridership
Between FY 2008–FY 2019 yearly ridership on the Manayunk/Norristown Line has ranged between 2.9 million–3.3 million.

Notes

References

External links

SEPTA Regional Rail